Birds described in 1891 include  Basra reed warbler, Cape shoveler, charming hummingbird, cobalt-winged parakeet, Lord Howe parakeet,  Kermadec red-crowned parakeet, Pangani longclaw, Patagonian yellow finch, Père David's tit,

Events
Peary expedition to Greenland
Joseph joins the British Ornithologists' Union
Death of  August von Pelzeln
Giacomo Damiani joins forces with Enrico Giglioli

Publications
Ernst Hartert Katalog der Vogelsammlung in Museum der Senckenbergischen Naturforschenden Gesellschaft in Frankfurt am Main Frankfurt a.M.,Knauer,1891. online
Tommaso Salvadori,  1891. Catalogue of birds in the British Museum. Vol. 20. British Museum, London.
Valentin Bianchi 1891 The birds of Gansu expedition of  G.N. Potanin 1884–1887 (with Mikhail Mikhailovich Berezovsky)
Richard Bowdler Sharpe Monograph of the Paradiseidae, or Birds of Paradise, and Ptilonorhynchidae, or Bower-birds. (2 volumes). London: Henry Sotheran. 1891–1898. online BHL
Ongoing events
Osbert Salvin and Frederick DuCane Godman 1879–1904. Biologia Centrali-Americana . Aves
Richard Bowdler Sharpe Catalogue of the Birds in the British Museum London,1874-98.
Eugene W. Oates and William Thomas Blanford 1889–1898. The Fauna of British India, Including Ceylon and Burma. Vols. I-IV. Birds.
Anton Reichenow, Jean Cabanis,  and other members of the German Ornithologists' Society in Journal für Ornithologie online BHL
The Ibis
Ornis; internationale Zeitschrift für die gesammte Ornithologie.Vienna 1885-1905online BHL
The Auk online BHL

References

Bird
Birding and ornithology by year